The Battle of Cannanore took place in 1506 off the harbour of Cannanore in India, between the Indian fleet of the Zamorin of Calicut and a Portuguese fleet under Lourenço de Almeida, son of the Viceroy Almeida. 

The Indian fleet, consisting of about 200 ships equipped with cannons manufactured with the help of two Milanese Italians, was manned by Hindu, Arab, and Turkish crews. This encounter ended in a Portuguese victory. It was followed by another Portuguese success at the siege of Cannanore in 1507, but then a Portuguese defeat at the Battle of Chaul in 1508.

See also 
 Portuguese India

References 

1506 in India
Cannanore
Cannanore (1506)
Portuguese in Kerala
1506 in Portugal
Cannanore